The 2022 NHRA Winternationals (known as the Lucas Oil Winternationals for sponsorship reasons) were a National Hot Rod Association (NHRA) drag racing event, held at Auto Club Raceway in Pomona, California on February 20, 2022.

Results

Top Fuel

Funny Car

Pro Stock

Notes 

NHRA Winternationals

Winternationals